The following highways are numbered 559:

Ireland
  R559 regional road

United States